Orlando Sanchez (February 5, 1982 – December 15, 2022) was an American practitioner of Brazilian jiu-jitsu and mixed martial arts (MMA) fighter. He was known as the Cuban Stump as well as the Big O.

Brazilian Jiu-Jitsu
Sanchez earned his black belt in BJJ in four years. He won the ADCC Submission Fighting World Championship in 2019 He was undefeated in MMA.

Personal life
Sanchez died in December 2022. He was survived by his wife and three children.

Mixed martial arts record 

|-
| Win
| align=center| 5–0–1
| Cesar Stubbert Cortez
| TKO (punches)
| CRF 16
| 
| align=center| 1
| align=center| 2:12
| San Jose, Costa Rica
|
|-
| NC
| align=center| 4–0–1
| Robert Gonzalez
| No Contest
| WFC 4
| 
| align=center| 1
| align=center| 4:35
| Sacramento, California, United States
|
|-
| Win
| align=center| 4–0
| C.J. Leveque
| TKO (submission to punches)
| WFC – Resolution 
| 
| align=center| 1
| align=center| 1:27
| Yuba City, California, United States
| 
|-
|  Win
| align=center| 3–0
| Julian Collins
| Submission 
| Maxx FC 16
| 
| align=center| 1
| align=center| 2:52
| San Juan, Puerto Rico
| 
|-
|  Win
| align=center| 2–0
| William Wheeler
| TKO (punches)
| National Fight Alliance
| 
| align=center| 1
| align=center| 0:56
| Los Angeles, California, United States
|
|-
|  Win
| align=center| 1–0
| Juan Miranda
| TKO (knees and punches)
| XVT 5
| 
| align=center| 1
| align=center| 0:13
| Cartago, Costa Rica
|

References

1982 births
2022 deaths
American practitioners of Brazilian jiu-jitsu
American male mixed martial artists
Brazilian jiu-jitsu practitioners who have competed in MMA (men)
Year of birth missing